Glenny is a name. Notable people with the name include:

Surname
Alexander Glenny (1882–1965), British immunologist
Alice Russell Glenny (1858–1924), American artist
Michael Glenny (1927–1990), British scholar of Russian studies
Misha Glenny (born 1958), British journalist
Robb W. Glenny, American pulmonologist

Given name
Glenny Cepeda (born 1981), Dominican tennis player
Glennys Farrar (born 1946), American physicist
Glennys L. McVeigh, Canadian jurist
Glennys Young, American historian

See also
Glenny Drive Apartments, defunct public housing project in Buffalo, New York
Henderson-Glenny Gadfly, 1929 British aircraft
Thresher & Glenny, British tailoring company